Virender Singh Pathania PTM, TM, is an Indian Coast Guard officer serving as the 24th and the current Director General of the Indian Coast Guard. He assumed the office on 31 December 2021 upon superannuation of Director General Krishnaswamy Natarajan. He is the first helicopter pilot to hold this position. Previously he served as Additional Director General of Indian Coast Guard and Coast Guard Commander of Western Seaboard.

• DOB : 1/10/1963

References 

Directors General of the Indian Coast Guard
Living people
Year of birth missing (living people)